Katrine Søndergaard Pedersen (born 13 April 1977) is a retired Danish football midfielder. She has played for and captained Denmark, for whom she accrued a national record 210 caps. In 2015, she was appointed assistant coach to the Danish national team.

Club career
At club level Pedersen spent the final years of her career with Norwegian club Stabæk, as a result of Stabæk taking over the bankrupt club Asker FK at the end of 2008.

Most of Pedersen's club football has been played outside Denmark. During 2002–03 she played for the English professional club Fulham Ladies, where she won a domestic treble. When Fulham reverted to semi-professional status several players left and Pedersen moved to Norway to join the Toppserien club IF Fløya based in Tromsø. After two seasons there she moved to spend the 2006 season playing in Stockholm, Sweden for the Damallsvenskan club Djurgården/Älvsjö. For the 2007 season she moved back to Norway to play for Asker SK in Oslo, and stayed there during 2008.

At the end of 2014, Pedersen joined Australian club Adelaide United.

International career
Pedersen made her senior international debut in September 1994; a 1–0 win over the Netherlands in Hoogezand. She was in her national team in the 2005 UEFA Women's Championship in North West England, and was captain at the FIFA Women's World Cup 2007 in China. She also played in earlier World Cup competitions in 1995 (as an 18-year-old) and 1999, as well as UEFA Women's Championships in 1997, 2001 and 2009.

When Pedersen was named in national coach Kenneth Heiner-Møller's squad for UEFA Women's Euro 2013 she was the most experienced active player in Europe, with 203 caps. In November 2013 she announced her pregnancy and retirement while accepting the Danish Player of the Year award. Her total of 210 international appearances is 81 more than her countryman, Peter Schmeichel. She was four games short of Birgit Prinz's record for European players.

Personal life
Pedersen works as a teacher and football trainer at a high-school in Oslo. In May 2011, her autobiography "Katrine" was published in Denmark. Pedersen is in a relationship with fellow former football player, Maiken Pape.

References

External links
Profile at Asker club site 
Profile at Stabæk club site
Danish Football Union (DBU) statistics

1977 births
Living people
Danish women's footballers
Denmark women's international footballers
1995 FIFA Women's World Cup players
1999 FIFA Women's World Cup players
2007 FIFA Women's World Cup players
FIFA Century Club
Expatriate women's footballers in England
Expatriate women's footballers in Norway
Expatriate women's footballers in Sweden
Expatriate women's soccer players in Australia
Fulham L.F.C. players
Djurgårdens IF Fotboll (women) players
Asker Fotball (women) players
Stabæk Fotball Kvinner players
Adelaide United FC (A-League Women) players
A-League Women players
Danish expatriate sportspeople in England
Danish expatriate sportspeople in Norway
Toppserien players
Danish expatriate sportspeople in Sweden
Danish expatriate sportspeople in Australia
Women's association football central defenders
Women's association football midfielders
Damallsvenskan players
Lesbian sportswomen
LGBT association football players
Danish LGBT sportspeople
Danish lesbians
People from Horsens
Sportspeople from the Central Denmark Region